Karte Parwan Gurdwara in the Karte Parwan section of Kabul, Afghanistan, is one of the main Gurdwaras in the region. Gurdawara means the Gateway to the Guru, and is a place of worship for Sikhs.

Background
There were thousands of Sikhs living in Kabul before the Soviet–Afghan War and Afghan Civil War (1992–1996). Many of them fled among the Afghan refugees in the 1980s and 1990s to India and neighboring Pakistan. After the American military involvement and the removal of the Taliban regime in late 2001, some of them decided to return. As of 2008, there are an estimated 2,500 Sikhs in Afghanistan.

The road outside the Gurdwara was widened prior to 2009 and the two rows of buildings and the courtyard of the Gurdwara have been reduced in size.

Attacks 
On October 5, 2021, some armed individuals which are assumed to be affiliated with the Taliban forcefully entered the site and began destroying the interior. Damage to furniture, walls, and windows were reported as well as several security cameras were destroyed.

On 18 June 2022, militants affiliated to the Islamic State-Khorasan Province stormed the gurdwara and fired at the worshippers. Later that day, the Islamic Emirate of Afghanistan's Interior Ministry spokesman Abdul Nafi Takor announced that the militants had been neutralized by ISEA soldiers and the gunfight resulted in the death of one ISEA soldier and a Sikh worshipper.

Gallery

See also

 Sikhism in Afghanistan
 Hinduism in Afghanistan

References

Buildings and structures in Kabul
Gurdwaras in Afghanistan
Religious buildings and structures in Kabul
Sikhism in Kabul